Ali Bakhtiar, born in 1973, is an Iranian politician who is currently representative of Golpayegan and Khvansar (electoral district) in the Parliament of Iran. He is a member of Legal and Judicial Commission.

He has been a member of the Pervasive Coalition of Reformists also known as The List of Hope for the parliamentary election campaign in 2016 Iranian legislative election.

External links 
Official website for Ali Bakhtiar
Webpage for Ali Bakhtiar in Iranian parliament Research Center

References

Living people
1973 births
Members of the 10th Islamic Consultative Assembly